The Under-19 Asia Rugby Championship is an annual rugby union championship for Under-19 national teams, held since 2005. The championship is organised by rugby's Asian governing body, the Asia Rugby.

The tournament serves as Asia's qualification to the next year's World Rugby Under 20 Trophy organised by the World Rugby.

Hong Kong are the current champions, having won their 6th successive title in Kaohsiung, Taiwan in 2019.

Results

References

External links
 Asia Rugby official website

Asia Rugby Championship
Asian youth sports competitions
Under-20 rugby union competitions